Offsider, album by Shayne Carter 2016
Offsiders, Australian TV show